John Parke Custis (November 27, 1754 – November 5, 1781) was an American planter. He was a son of Martha Washington and stepson of George Washington.

Childhood
A son of Daniel Parke Custis, a wealthy planter with nearly three hundred enslaved persons and thousands of acres of land, and Martha Dandridge Custis, he was most likely born at White House, his parents' plantation on the Pamunkey River in New Kent County, Virginia.

Following his father's death in 1757, almost  of land and about 285 enslaved persons were held in trust for him until he came of age. In January 1759, his mother married George Washington. The Washingtons raised him and his younger sister Martha (Patsy) Parke Custis (1756–1773) at Mount Vernon. Washington became his legal guardian and the administrator of the Custis Estate. Upon his sister's death in 1773 at the age of seventeen, Custis became the sole heir of the Custis estate. "Jacky", as he was known by his family, was a troubled, lazy and "free-willed" child who took no interest in his studies.

Family and works
In 1773, at the age of eighteen, Jacky announced to the Washingtons his engagement to Eleanor Calvert, a daughter of Benedict Swingate Calvert and granddaughter of Charles Calvert, 5th Baron Baltimore.  George and Martha were greatly surprised by the marriage choice due to the couple being so young. During that year, Custis began to attend King's College (later Columbia University) in New York City, but left soon afterwards when his sister died.

On February 3, 1774, Custis married Eleanor at her family's home at the Mount Airy estate. Its restored mansion is the center of Rosaryville State Park in Prince George's County, Maryland. After their marriage, the couple settled at the White House plantation.  After the couple had lived at the White House for more than two years, Custis purchased the Abingdon plantation in Fairfax County, Virginia (now in Arlington County, Virginia). The couple settled there during the winter of 1778–1779.

The terms of Abingdon's purchase were extremely unfavorable to Custis. His eagerness and inexperience allowed Abingdon's owner, Robert Alexander, to take advantage of him in the transaction, which required Custis to pay the principal of the purchase and compound interest over a 24-year period. The compound interest on the £12,000 purchase price would require Custis to pay over £48,000 during the 24 years. To accomplish this, Custis would need to pay over £2,000 each year during the period of the agreement. When he learned of the terms of the purchase, George Washington informed Custis that "No Virginia Estate (except a few under the best management) can stand simple Interest how then can they bear compound Interest".

Custis' behavior in this and other matters prompted George Washington to write in 1778: "I am afraid Jack Custis, in spite of all of the admonition and advice I gave him about selling faster than he bought, is making a ruinous hand of his Estate."  By 1781, the financial strains of the Abingdon purchase had almost bankrupted Custis.

According to one account, Custis served on Washington's staff during the Siege of Boston in 1775–1776 and served as an emissary to the British forces there.

In 1778, Custis was elected to the Virginia House of Burgesses as a delegate from Fairfax County.
George Washington was not pleased with Custis' reported performance in the legislature. Washington wrote to Custis:

I do not suppose that so young a senator as you are, so little versed in political disquisition, can yet have much influence in a popular assembly, composed of various talents and different views, but it is in your power to be punctual in attendance.

John and Eleanor had seven children:
 unnamed daughter (1775–1775), died shortly after birth 
 Elizabeth (Eliza) Parke Custis (1776–1831), married Thomas Law, an English immigrant
 Martha (Patsy) Parke Custis (1777–1854), married Thomas Peter
 Eleanor (Nelly) Parke Custis (1779–1852) (born at Abingdon), married Lawrence Lewis
 unnamed twin daughters (1780–1780), died three weeks after birth
 George Washington (Wash) Parke Custis (1781–1857) (born at Mount Airy), married Mary Lee Fitzhugh.

Death
Custis served as a civilian aide-de-camp to Washington during the siege of Yorktown. However, Custis contracted "camp fever", which could have been an illness now described as epidemic typhus, or dysentery  while at Yorktown. Shortly after the surrender of Cornwallis, Custis died on November 5, 1781, in New Kent County at Eltham, Virginia, in the home of Colonel Burwell Bassett, brother-in-law of Martha Washington. He was buried at his family's plot near Queen's Creek, in York County, near Williamsburg, Virginia.

With Custis's premature death at 26, his widow sent her two youngest children (Eleanor and George) to Mount Vernon to be raised by the Washingtons. In 1783, she married David Stuart of Alexandria, Virginia, with whom she had 16 more children.

Although Custis had become well-established at Abingdon, his financial matters were in a state of disarray because of his poor business judgement and wartime taxation. After his death in 1781, it took the administrators of the Custis Estate more than a decade to negotiate an end to the transaction through which Custis had purchased Abingdon. Because he died intestate, his estate was not fully liquidated until the 1811 death of his widow. His four children inherited more than 600 slaves.

Part of the Abingdon estate is now on the grounds of Ronald Reagan Washington National Airport. When he purchased Abingdon, Custis also bought a nearby property that after his death became Arlington Plantation and later, Arlington National Cemetery.

Ancestry

Notes
  At Google Books.

References

External links 

 John Parke Custis, Mount Vernon Digital Encyclopedia

1754 births
1781 deaths
18th-century American Episcopalians
American planters
American people of English descent
British North American Anglicans
Columbia College (New York) alumni
Custis family of Virginia
Members of the Virginia House of Delegates
People from New Kent County, Virginia
Washington family
Children of presidents of the United States
Calvert family
Burials in Virginia
American Revolutionary War deaths
American slave owners
18th-century American politicians